Bhuvan Srinivasan is an Indian film editor. Having made his debut with the independent Hindi /English film, Delhi in a Day (2012), Bhuvan has received critical acclaim for his work in films such as Arima Nambi (2014), Demonte Colony (2015) and Imaikkaa Nodigal (2018).

Career
Bhuvan Srinivasan completed a bachelor's degree in commerce from Loyola College, Chennai, before doing a diploma in editing and sound design at the LV Prasad Film and Television Academy. Bhuvan Srinivasan worked as an associate editor to Sreekar Prasad for five years and worked on thirty films with the senior editor, including Raavanan (2010), Agent Vinod (2012), Cocktail (2012), Thuppakki (2012) and Kadal (2013) to name a few. He then worked on the independent Hindi film, Delhi in a Day (2012), before being approached by Anand Shankar to edit Arima Nambi (2014). Bhuvan has moved on to work on both critically acclaimed and commercially successful films such as Demonte Colony (2015), Kanithan (2016), Iru Mugan (2016), Kuttram 23 (2016) Imaikkaa Nodigal (2018), Maara (2021), and upcoming Cobra (2021).

Filmography

References

External links
 

Living people
Tamil film editors
Artists from Chennai
1986 births
Film editors from Tamil Nadu